The Council of Smaller Enterprises, known as COSE, is a division of the Greater Cleveland Partnership and an organization that coordinates the activities of and provides resources and advocacy for small businesses in the Greater Cleveland area. It is the largest regional small business group in the United States.

Advocacy
In 1991, John Polk, the head of the organization at the time, spoke out against mandates for employers to provide health insurance, arguing that such mandates hurt small employers since those businesses were least able to afford health insurance. In 2005, the organization was advocating for health care reform at the national level, particularly focusing on reform oriented towards reducing health care costs.

Energy
COSE offers energy solutions that allow its members to save on energy, as well as install more energy efficient systems. It partnered with Metrus Energy and CalCEF to create the Ohio Efficiency Resource Program, a financial tool that allows COSE members to install energy efficient programs with no upfront cost or risk.

Small Business Convention
The COSE Small Business Convention, The largest event that COSE hosts, is on an annual basis. Last year, the convention was hosted in Sandusky, Ohio at the Kalahari Convention Center. The COSE Small Business Convention is the largest in the Midwest.

References

External links

Business organizations based in the United States
Economy of Cleveland
Employers' organizations
Organizations based in Cleveland